The UK R&B Chart is a weekly chart, first introduced in October 1994, that ranks the 40 biggest-selling singles and albums that are classified in the R&B genre in the United Kingdom. The chart is compiled by the Official Charts Company, and is based on sales of CDs, downloads, vinyl and other formats over the previous seven days.
 
The following are the number-one albums of 2001.

Number-one albums

See also

List of UK Albums Chart number ones of the 2010s

References

External links
Official R&B Albums Chart Top 40 at the Official Charts Company
UK Top 40 RnB Albums at BBC Radio 1

2001 in British music
United Kingdom RandB Albums
2001